John McNally (born 18 October 1998) is a former American tennis player.

Juniors
On the junior tour, McNally had a career high ranking of No. 13 achieved on 30 May 2016.

Professional career
McNally made his Grand Slam main draw debut at the 2016 US Open in the doubles event, partnering J. J. Wolf.

He won his first Professional Title at the ITF Mens 25K Future in Columbus, Ohio.(November 2021)

He received a wild card into qualifying for the 2019 Western & Southern Open.

His younger sister, Caty McNally, is also a professional tennis player. Both are coached by their mother.

On 13 November 2022, he announced his retirement via Instagram.

ATP Challenger and ITF Futures finals

Singles: 2 (1–1)

Doubles: 7 (5–2)

References

External links
 
 

1998 births
Living people
American male tennis players
Tennis players from Cincinnati
Ohio State Buckeyes men's tennis players